At least two ships of the French Navy have borne the name Vauban:

 , lead ship of the  launched in 1882 and stricken in 1905
 , a  launched in 1930 and scuttled in 1942

French Navy ship names